Louis Moss (born 23 October 1992) is a professional footballer who plays as a midfielder for Colwyn Bay. Born in England, he represents Barbados at international level.

Club career
Moss began his career with Wrexham in the 2010–11 season, scoring in his debut against Luton Town.

He left Wrexham after the 2011–12 season. He next played for Ventura County Fusion in the United States' USL PDL.

He signed for Vauxhall Motors in August 2012 after trialing at Welsh Premier League club Aberystwyth Town.

He and his brother Ed signed for Colwyn Bay ahead of the 2013–14 season. He left the club in March 2014 to find regular first team football but rejoined again in June.

He later played for Chester Nomads and Runcorn Town. He then signed for Oswestry Town in January 2018, returning to the club in August 2018 following a spell in Australia with Peninsula Strikers.

International career
He qualifies for Barbados through his mother, who was born on the Caribbean island.

He represented Barbados at under-15 and under-17 youth levels.

He made his international debut for Barbados in 2011, and he has appeared in three FIFA World Cup qualifying matches to date, as of December 2011. In September 2014, he was again called up by the national team after a three-year period without caps, when he was named in the squad for the second Caribbean qualifying round of the 2015 CONCACAF Gold Cup.

References

1992 births
Living people
Sportspeople from Chester
English footballers
People with acquired Barbadian citizenship
Barbadian footballers
Barbados international footballers
English sportspeople of Barbadian descent
Wrexham A.F.C. players
Ventura County Fusion players
Vauxhall Motors F.C. players
Colwyn Bay F.C. players
Runcorn Town F.C. players
F.C. Oswestry Town players
Peninsula Strikers FC players
Association football midfielders
National League (English football) players
USL League Two players
English expatriate footballers
English expatriate sportspeople in the United States
Expatriate soccer players in the United States
English expatriate sportspeople in Australia
Expatriate soccer players in Australia